Drasteria divergens is a moth of the family Erebidae. It is found from California to Colorado, north to British Columbia.

The wingspan is about 44 mm. Adults are on wing from March to August in California.

References

External links

Drasteria
Moths of North America
Fauna of the California chaparral and woodlands
Fauna of the Sierra Nevada (United States)
Moths described in 1870